Chrysopophthorus is a genus of wasps in the family Braconidae.

References 

 Austin, A.D.; Wharton, R.A. 1992: New records of subfamilies, tribes and genera of Braconidae (Insecta: Hymenoptera) from Australia, with description of seven new species. Transactions of the Royal Society of South Australia, 116: 41-63
 The Palaearctic species of the genus Chrysopophthorus Goidanich (Hymenoptera: Braconidae, Euphorinae). C van Achterberg, Zool. Meded. Leiden, 1994
 The genus Chrysopophthorus Goidanich (Hymenoptera: Braconidae). WRM Mason, The Canadian Entomologist, 1964

External links 
 

 
 Chrysopophthorus at insectoid.info

Euphorinae
Braconidae genera